Shaun Earle Fitzmaurice (born August 25, 1942) is an American former professional baseball outfielder. He played in Major League Baseball (MLB) for the New York Mets in 1966.

Biography
Fitzmaurice played college baseball for the Notre Dame Fighting Irish baseball team. He represented the United States in baseball at the 1964 Summer Olympics as a demonstration sport in Tokyo.

Fitzmaurice's professional career spanned 1964 to 1973; he played for farm teams of the New York Mets, Pittsburgh Pirates, New York Yankees, and Atlanta Braves. His only MLB appearances came with the Mets in 1966; in nine games, he had two hits in 13 at-bats and scored two runs. In his minor-league career, he played in over 800 games, primarily at the Triple-A level.

References

Further reading

External links

1942 births
Living people
Baseball players at the 1964 Summer Olympics
Baseball players from Worcester, Massachusetts
Columbus Jets players
Jacksonville Suns players
Major League Baseball outfielders
New York Mets players
Notre Dame Fighting Irish baseball players
Richmond Braves players
Syracuse Chiefs players
University of Notre Dame alumni
Williamsport Mets players
York Pirates players